Mark Latimer is an English pianist.

His repertoire consists of over 75 performed piano concertos, including the mammoth Concerto for Piano and Chorus by Busoni  and the Alkan Concerto for Solo Piano, of which he made the first live recording.  He is also a  composer and has had numerous works performed and recorded.

He performed Rachmaninoff's 3rd piano concerto at the age of 12 and Rachmaninoff's 3rd and Prokofiev's 2nd piano concertos at the age of 16, shortly followed by a performance of both piano concertos by Brahms (No. 1, No. 2).

He became a professor of music at the London College of Music at age 18.

He is also known for his performances of pieces by lesser known composers such as Sorabji, Reger, Honegger, Lambert and others. As well as piano he has also recorded a number of organ works including an hour-long organ and prepared piano CD Zeitgeist, which is completely improvised. An ongoing series of "Take" jazz CDs have been recorded, alongside his own suite, "Exhibitionist at the Pictures".

Discography 

Variations and Fugues - Max Reger - Warner Classics - ASIN: B0002VE20Q
Zeitgeist - Latimer - Munitions Factory
Concerto for Solo Piano - Charles Valentin Alkan - APR - ASIN: B000065AI9
Take #1 - Various - Spotlite - ASIN: B000056P18
Unhinged Take #2 - Various - Spotlite - ASIN: B00006AGBB
Smooth Jazz For A Rainy Day - Various

External links
 Official website
 An interview with Mark Latimer

English classical pianists
Male classical pianists
Living people
21st-century classical pianists
Year of birth missing (living people)
21st-century British male musicians